Svyatorussovka is a rural locality (a selo) and the administrative center of Svyatorussovsky Selsoviet of Romnensky District, Amur Oblast, Russia. The population was 307 as of 2018. There are 3 streets.

Geography 
Svyatorussovka is located on the right bank of the Belaya River, 19 km southwest of Romny (the district's administrative centre) by road. Lyubimoye is the nearest rural locality.

References 

Rural localities in Romnensky District